Working Tax Credit (WTC) is a state benefit in the United Kingdom made to people who work and have a low income. It was introduced in April 2003 and is a means-tested benefit. Despite their name, tax credits are not to be confused with tax credits linked to a person's tax bill, because they are used to top-up wages. Unlike most other benefits, it is paid by HM Revenue and Customs (HMRC).

WTC can be claimed by working individuals, childless couples and working families with dependent children. In addition, people may also be entitled to Child Tax Credit (CTC) if they are responsible for any children. WTC and CTC are assessed jointly and families remain eligible for CTC even if where no adult is working or they have too much income to receive WTC.

In 2010 the coalition government announced that the Working Tax Credit would, by 2017, be integrated into and replaced by the new Universal Credit. However implementation of this has been repeatedly delayed and will not be finished until 2024 at the earliest. Since 2018 no new claims can be made for Working Tax Credit, only Universal Credit.

History 
The WTC replaced the Working Families Tax Credit (WFTC), which operated from April 1999 until March 2003. The WFTC was itself a transitional system from the earlier benefit for working families known as Family Credit (FC), which had been in operation since 1986.

The WFTC shared its assessment of means and period of renewal (6 months) with FC but moved towards a tax credit approach styled on schemes in other countries, which used an annual declaration of income to assess entitlement for a whole year. Tax credits also replaced the child elements in means tested benefits, the Children's Tax Credit in the tax system, and disabled persons tax credit.

In 2014 WTC and CTC combined distributed £30 billion per year.

How it works 
The basic operation of the tax credit is broken down into the following steps:

 An individual makes an application for WTC to HM Revenue and Customs (HMRC).
 HMRC calculates a provisional amount of tax credit to be awarded.  It is based on the previous tax year's income and current circumstances. The tax credit is then paid in weekly or four weekly instalments to the claimant via bank account until the end of the tax year, 5 April.  It is possible to ask HMRC to base their calculations on the estimated current year's income, but this does carry some risks.
 After the end of the tax year, HMRC send claimants forms (TC603R and TC603D commonly called renewal or declaration forms) asking them to confirm their actual income for the year just ended. For those who do not have actual income figures available, they must provide an estimate to HMRC, usually by 31 July and confirm this, usually by the following 31 January.
 A final calculation of the WTC is made using the confirmed income.  This final amount might be greater, equal to or lower than the provisional amount received the previous year.
 If someone received more than the final WTC calculation, this is an over payment and must be repaid to HMRC. Similarly, if someone received less than the final WTC calculation, this is an underpayment in which case HMRC will make a lump sum payment back to that person.

Calculation of the annual award 
The amount of the award is calculated from two separate amount as follows:

WTC award = Elements minus Withdrawal

The component called Elements is based on circumstances whilst the Withdrawal component is income based.  The following sections describe how each component is arrived at.

Elements 
The Working Tax Credit (WTC) and the Child Tax Credit (CTC) are made up of "elements" related to individual circumstances. Examples of elements for an entire year are:
 a basic element of £1,890 payable to everyone (in 2009/2010)
 a couple and lone parent element (£1,860)
 a 30 hour [working week] element (£775)
 a mildly or moderately disabled worker element (£2,530)
 a severely disabled worker element (£1,075)
 a 50+ return-to-work payment (discontinued after April 2012).

Each element that applies to a claimant's circumstances is added together to determine the maximum award of tax credit (before any withdrawal is considered).  For example, a couple would have elements calculated as

Elements = £1,890 + £1,860 = £3,750

Withdrawal 
The withdrawal rate is the amount that is deducted from the Elements described above.  If the gross annual income exceeds a predetermined first threshold of £6,420 (in 2013/14) then the withdrawal rate is 41 percent. This means that for every £1 earned above the threshold, 41p of the WTC entitlement is withdrawn.

As withdrawal of tax credits is based on 'gross' rather than 'net' income, however, the claimant is also subject to Class 1 NIC national insurance contributions at 12 percent and UK income tax at 20 percent—making an effective marginal tax rate of 73 percent.

For example, if one person in a couple earns £10,000 pa, then the amount of withdrawal is

Withdrawal = 41% times (10,000 - 6,420) = £1,467.80

Under withdrawal, entitlement to WTC is gradually reduced first until 'exhausted' at an income level that can be calculated from the first threshold and the basic award. For a couple, for instance, this would be:

£6,420, plus (£1,920 + £1,970) divided by 41%. That is £15,908 in rounded figures.

Amount of WTC 
In this example, the award is then calculated as follows:

WTC = Elements - Withdrawal = £3,750 - £1,396.20 = £2,353.80

Interaction with Child Tax Credit 

WTC and CTC were designed to be a seamless allowance that steadily reduces as family income rises.

If they are claimed together, both combine to form the basic award. This combined award is subject to withdrawal from the point at which WTC entitlement would have been zero (called the First threshold for those entitled to Child Tax Credit only).  In 2009/10 this threshold was £16,040.

However, unlike WTC, CTC does not continue to reduce to zero.  It reduces only until it reaches the "basic family element" of £545pa. Thereafter it remains fixed until the household reaches a second income threshold  (£50,000 in 2009/10). After that it reduces again at a rate of £1 for every £15 of income.

Recipient households of combined WTC/CTC awards thus fell into three categories

 those on a 'main-rate' reduction of 70% (i.e. marginal tax + 39%) receiving > £545pa
 those on an income of up to £50,000 in receipt of the small flat rate family element (i.e. marginal tax only) receiving £545pa
 those with incomes between £50,000 and £58,170 (i.e. marginal tax + 6.67%) receiving £545pa

Awards and disregards 
WTC and CTC for the current tax year are considered to be an interim award because they are based on the previous tax year's gross household income. Final awards would need to be adjusted in subsequent years when the actual income is known.

Since large fluctuations from year to year would be undesirable, broad allowance is made for this by disregarding the first £2,500 of any increase in the final income from one year to the next. Only changes in excess of this income disregard are taken into account in establishing a final award. Overpayments are recovered by adjustment to the amount of the following years' interim award.

Tax credits have not proved to be nearly as robust or well administered as the initial design envisaged. Claimants have not always recognised the need to report any change of circumstances immediately. The time taken by the system of administration to then take these into account adds to any overpayment generated and shortens the time available for their recovery.  This led to significant levels of overpayments. In order to reduce the overpayment problem, the income disregard was raised tenfold from £2,500 to £25,000 with effect from 2006/07.

Assessment of income 
Income for tax credit purposes is in principle assessed similarly to UK income tax. Thus 'income' (c/f 'taxable income') consists of what the individual receives from gross earned and unearned sources—less allowances for 'expenditures' that would reduce that income. But, unlike income tax, tax credits measure income based on family 'household', rather than the individuals within. Also the effect of income disregard —to mask large annual increases in resources from reassessment— weakens comparisons with a true income tax still further.

By comparison with other means tested benefits, the income treatment of claimants of tax credits is especially generous; it permits deduction of the full gross amount (rather than 50% net) of any individual pension contributions and any Gift aid payments. Since increases in income are subject to withdrawal at 39%(in the initial range), such reductions are effectively 'rebated' at the same rate through the tax credits received. Thus, while a pension (or Gift Aid) contribution of £100 will cost the employee £80 (after basic rate tax relief) directly from net pay, it attracts an additional £39 in tax credits; so the true cost is only £41.

Other concessions with regard to assessment of income (in contrast to means testing used elsewhere) include:

 disregarding the first £300 of 'other' gross income (rent, interest or dividends etc.).
 disregarding 'other' income derived from tax-free savings and investments
 having no explicit (ineligibility) limit for capital resources (as only actual income derived from capital is taken into account)

Level of take-up

Around 7 million people in the UK were entitled to claim Working Tax Credit or the companion Child Tax Credit, although around 2 million people do not do so.

The levels of Tax Credit take-up in the UK have not risen in recent years, despite an increase  of 100,000 children living in households classed as "below the poverty line" between 2004 and 2005.

Implementation difficulties

The introduction of the Working Tax Credit scheme was marred by implementation issues and large-scale overpayments. The Office of National Statistics estimated that of the £13.5bn paid out in tax credits in 2004, £1.9bn consisted of overpayments. In addition, computer problems led to delays in many receiving payments, causing significant financial hardship for those on low incomes, and resulting in EDS losing its contract to provide the Inland Revenue with computer services.

These problems led to considerable political fallout. Dawn Primarolo, who as Paymaster General was the minister responsible for the implementation of tax credits, had to apologise to parliament and was asked whether she had "lost control" of her department. Prime Minister Tony Blair also apologised to Parliament over the incident.

Criticism
The Working Tax Credit scheme was subject to much criticism, particularly in the wake of the difficulties surrounding its implementation. Criticism focused on the way that credits are calculated on an annual basis, leading to overpayment, followed by large demands for repayment, which those on low income may find difficult to meet. David Harker, chief executive of Citizens Advice, commented "This is an untenable system. An annualised system doesn't provide the stability of income required by low income families." In addition, the scheme was accused of being over-complicated and difficult for claimants to understand, and of underestimating the extent to which the incomes of low earners can fluctuate over a year, especially a problem for self-employed people whose income may fall below the minimum wage (at which point Working Tax Credit is disallowed).

The Labour Party claimed that the tax credit system was effective in tackling child poverty, with, by their  government's definitions, 2 million children lifted out of absolute poverty and almost 1 million out of relative poverty by 2007. However, the subsequent Coalition government sought to redefine poverty so as to highlight "children living in workless households or those with drug-dependent parents", despite their tax credit incomes, remaining in poverty. Even with the previous definition, this government claimed that the existing tax credits system failed to "meet its statutory target to halve the problem by 2010 – despite the huge amount of taxpayers’ money spent on tackling it."

See also
Taxation in the United Kingdom
UK labour law
Earned income tax credit (1975) and New Jobs tax credit (1977) in the US

References

External links

House of Commons Public Accounts Committee report into Tax Credits and Overpayment
Tax Credit Casualties
Tax Credits rates and elements
Working Tax Credit 

Child welfare in the United Kingdom
Social security in the United Kingdom
Tax credits
Taxation in the United Kingdom